Bobby Armani Decordova-Reid (né Reid; born 2 February 1993) is a professional footballer who plays as a forward for  club Fulham. Born in England, he represents the Jamaica national team.

Early and personal life
Decordova-Reid was born in Bristol, England, and is of Jamaican descent. He grew up in the inner-city neighbourhood of Easton. Decordova-Reid is cousin to Anthony McNamee, a fellow footballer whose clubs include Watford and Norwich City. In October 2018 he changed his name to Bobby Decordova-Reid. 'Decordova' is his mother's name and Reid added it because he "wanted to represent her after the hard work she's done for me". 

His older sister is Labour Member of Parliament Marsha de Cordova.

Club career

Bristol City
After playing for their youth team, Reid was offered a professional contract by Bristol City on 4 April 2011, and was called up to the first team for the last game of the 2010–11 season, where he made his senior debut. In November 2011 Reid signed on loan for Cheltenham Town until the end of the year. On 25 March 2013, Reid signed on loan for Oldham Athletic until the end of the 2012–13 season.

He signed a one-month loan deal with Plymouth Argyle in September 2014. The loan deal was then extended for a second month, before he was recalled early following injury problems back at Bristol City. After making one appearance for his parent club, he returned on loan to Plymouth later that month. He returned to Plymouth for a third loan spell in January 2015. Bobby Reid played 27 times in the Football League Championship the following season, scoring two goals as City finished 18th, avoiding relegation straight  back to Football League One.

Reid featured as Bristol City reached  the semi finals of the 2017–18 EFL Cup with wins over Premier League opponents Watford, Stoke City, Crystal Palace and Manchester United. Reid scored in the semi-final defeat against Premier League leaders Manchester City.

Cardiff City
On 28 June 2018, Reid signed for Premier League newcomers, Cardiff City, on a four-year deal for a reported fee of £10 million. He described the 2017–18 season as 'crazy'. He made his debut for the club on the opening day of the 2018–19 season during a 2–0 defeat to AFC Bournemouth. Reid scored his first goal in a Cardiff shirt in a 4–2 win over Fulham on 20 October. On 2 February 2019, on his 26th birthday and also the first home game since the disappearance of new signing Emiliano Sala, Reid scored both goals of a win over AFC Bournemouth.

Fulham
In August 2019 he moved to Fulham on loan. Reid made his debut in a 2–0 win against Blackburn Rovers in the EFL Championship on 10 August 2019. He scored his first goal for the club in a 3–0 win against Derby County on 26 November 2019. The deal became permanent on 24 January 2020, with Reid signing a three-and-a-half year contract.

Decordova-Reid finished the 2020–21 season as Fulham's top scorer but the club were relegated from the Premier League after a single season in the top-flight.

On 14 August 2021, he provided three assists in a 5–1 away win over Huddersfield Town.

International career
In June 2019, Reid received an invite to play for the Jamaica national side for the CONCACAF Gold Cup the following month. That August, he was officially called up for CONCACAF Nations League matches against Antigua and Barbuda and Guyana. He made his debut against the former on 6 September and scored in a 6–0 victory.

Career statistics

Club

International

Scores and results list Jamaica's goal tally first, score column indicates score after each Decordova-Reid goal.

Honours
Fulham
EFL Championship: 2021–22
EFL Championship play-offs: 2020

Individual
EFL Team of the Season: 2017–18
PFA Team of the Year: 2017–18 Championship
CONCACAF Gold Cup Goal of the Tournament: 2021

References

External links
Profile at the Fulham F.C. website

1993 births
Living people
Footballers from Bristol
English footballers
Jamaican footballers
Association football forwards
Bristol City F.C. players
Cheltenham Town F.C. players
Oldham Athletic A.F.C. players
Plymouth Argyle F.C. players
Cardiff City F.C. players
Fulham F.C. players
English Football League players
Premier League players
Jamaica international footballers
2021 CONCACAF Gold Cup players
English people of Jamaican descent